Korydallos Sports Hall (Greek: Κλειστό Γυμναστήριο Κορυδαλλού) is an indoor arena that is located in Korydallos, Piraeus, Greece. It is a part of the Korydallos Municipal Sports Center. The arena is mainly used to host volleyball and basketball games. It has a permanent seating capacity of 2,387 people, and can hold up to 3,000 people with additional removable tiered seating.

History
Korydallos Indoor Hall opened in 1994. The Greek Basket League and EuroLeague club Olympiacos, used the arena as its home arena, during the 2002–03 and 2003–04 seasons.

References

External links
Information on the arena @ Stadia.gr
Image of Korydallos Sports Hall Exterior
Image 1 of Korydallos Sports Hall Interior
Image 2 of Korydallos Sports Hall Interior
Image 3 of Korydallos Sports Hall Interior

Indoor arenas in Greece
Basketball venues in Greece
Olympiacos B.C.
Sports venues in Attica
Volleyball venues in Greece